SPRY domain-containing SOCS box protein 1 is a protein that in humans is encoded by the SPSB1 gene.

References

Further reading